Renu Khator is the fifth chancellor of the University of Houston System (UH System) and the thirteenth president of the University of Houston. In 2008, she became the first female chancellor in the state of Texas and the first Indian immigrant to lead a comprehensive research university in the U.S.

Career
Prior to moving to the United States, Khator earned a bachelor's degree from the Kanpur University in 1973 in liberal arts. Moving soon thereafter, she attended Purdue University and received a Master of Arts in political science and a Doctor of Philosophy in political science and public administration in 1975 and 1985, respectively.

Beginning in 1985, Khator began a 22-year career affiliation with the University of South Florida. She served in various positions, culminating in her position as provost and senior vice president of the university.

On October 15, 2007, Khator emerged as the sole-finalist for the vacant dual-position as chancellor of the University of Houston System and president of the University of Houston. On November 5, 2007, she was confirmed by the University of Houston System Board of Regents for the dual-position and officially took office on January 15, 2008, and became the third person to hold a dual position of University of Houston System chancellor and University of Houston president.

Board and committee memberships 

Khator sits or has served on the following public and private boards:
 American Athletic Conference Board of Directors (Chair) 
 Association of Governing Boards of Colleges and Universities Council of Presidents 
 U.S. Department of Homeland Security Academic Advisory Council 
 NCAA Division I Presidential Forum 
 Council on Foreign Relations 
 Greater Houston Partnership Board of Directors 
 Indo-American Chamber of Commerce of Greater Houston Board of Advisors 
 Texas Medical Center Advisory Board 
 The Coalition of Urban Serving Universities Board of Directors 
 American Council on Education (ACE) Chair 
 Federal Reserve Bank of Dallas, 11th District, Chair

Research interest 
Khator has published five books as well as various chapters and articles on global public administration, environmental issues and South Asian politics.

The University of Houston System 
As chancellor of the UH System, Khator oversees four institutions of higher learning serving close to 76,000 students.  Composed of UH, UH-Downtown, UH-Clear Lake and UH-Victoria, the UH System has an annual budget over $1.8 billion and results in a $6 billion-plus impact on the Greater Houston area each year.

The University of Houston 
As president of the University of Houston, Khator is the CEO of the UH System flagship university. The oldest and largest institution in the UH System, UH enrolls approximately 47,000 students and awards over 11,000 degrees each year. 

 In 2011, UH earned Tier One status for highest research activity from the Carnegie Foundation. 
 UH more than tripled the number of National Academy members on the faculty and dramatically improved the graduation rates. 
 UH has undergone an extensive era of construction under a $1-billion campus construction program, resulting in the 40,000-seat TDECU Stadium, increased student residence hall capacity to 8,000 and an $80-million expansion and renovation to the student center. 
 The university launched new athletic training facilities and venues, including the Fertitta Center, the Guy V.  Lewis Basketball Training Complex and the Houston Baseball Player Development Center. 
 In 2015, UH was awarded a chapter of the prestigious Phi Beta Kappa honor society. 
 In 2019, Khator helped raise more than $1 billion for UH's "Here, We Go" campaign, surpassing its goal 18 months ahead of its scheduled completion.
 In 2020, the university opened its new Tilman J. Fertitta College of Medicine, Houston's first medical school in more than 40 years.
 In 2021, UH accepted an invitation to join the Big 12 Conference and all University sports teams will begin competing in the competition in 2023.

Personal life
Khator was born in Farrukhabad, Uttar Pradesh (India). Through a traditional arranged marriage, she married her husband, Suresh, in 1974. Suresh—another Purdue graduate—holds a doctorate in engineering, and is a professor and associate dean of the UH's Cullen College of Engineering. The Khators have two daughters, Pooja and Parul, who are both ophthalmologists, and three grandchildren. As chancellor of UH System and president of UH, she takes residence in the Wortham House provided for her and her family in the Broadacres neighborhood of Houston.

Notable awards 
Khator has received many awards over the length of her career. She was inducted into the Texas Women's Hall of Fame, she received the Excellence in Leadership Awards from the U.S. Hispanic Chamber of Commerce, she received the President of the Year Award from the Association of College Unions International, and the President's Award from the National Association of Student Affairs Administrators.

Khator also was awarded the Pravasi Bharatiya Samman from the President Pranab Mukerjee of India, the highest honor given to overseas Indians.

Purdue University honored Khator with a Doctor of Social Sciences degree, honoris causa, and Swansea University awarded her with a Doctor of Letters, honoris causa.

In 2020, Khator has been elected to the prestigious American Academy of Arts and Sciences for her contributions in the fields of education and academic leadership.

References

External links

Office of the President

Chancellors of the University of Houston System
Presidents of the University of Houston
Purdue University alumni
American Hindus
Living people
People from Farrukhabad
Chhatrapati Shahu Ji Maharaj University alumni
American academics of Indian descent
University of South Florida faculty
1958 births
Recipients of Pravasi Bharatiya Samman
1955 births